Nethmi Ahinsa Fernando Poruthotage (born 17 June 2004) is a Sri Lankan wrestler. She won a bronze medal in the 2022 Commonwealth Games. By winning a bronze medal in the Women's 57 kg event, it marked Sri Lanka's first ever medal in the sport of wrestling and becoming the youngest ever Sri Lankan medalist at the Commonwealth Games.

Poruthotage was born in Welpalla, Sri Lanka.

References

External links
 

Living people
Commonwealth Games bronze medallists for Sri Lanka
Commonwealth Games medallists in wrestling
Wrestlers at the 2022 Commonwealth Games
2004 births
Sri Lankan sport wrestlers
21st-century Sri Lankan women
Medallists at the 2022 Commonwealth Games